The Rural Municipality of Lumsden No. 189 is a rural municipality (RM) in the Canadian province of Saskatchewan within Census Division No. 6 and  Division No. 2. It is located in the south-east portion of the province.

History 
The RM of Lumsden No. 189 incorporated as a rural municipality on December 9, 1912. It is named after Hugh D. Lumsden who was the chief surveyor on the project in 1887 to take the railroad from Regina to Prince Albert.

Geography

Communities and localities 
The following urban municipalities are surrounded by the RM.

Towns
Lumsden
Regina Beach

Villages
Buena Vista
Craven
Disley

Resort villages
Lumsden Beach

The following unincorporated communities are within the RM.

Organized hamlets
Deer Valley

Transportation
Saskatchewan Highway 6
Saskatchewan Highway 11
Saskatchewan Highway 20
Saskatchewan Highway 54
Saskatchewan Highway 99
Saskatchewan Highway 641
Saskatchewan Highway 729
Saskatchewan Highway 734
Regina Beach Airport

Demographics 

Government 
The RM of Lumsden No. 189 is governed by an elected municipal council and an appointed administrator that meets on the second and fourth Thursday of every month. The reeve of the RM is Kent Farago while its administrator is Monica Merkosky. The RM's office is located in Lumsden.

References

External links 

Lumsden

Division No. 6, Saskatchewan